Vanuatu competed at the 2022 Commonwealth Games at Birmingham, England from 28 July to 8 August 2022. It was Vanuatu's eleventh appearance at the Games.

The Vanuatu team consisted of 17 athletes. Judoka Joe Mahit, beach volleyball athlete Miller Pata and para-athlete/powerlifter Ellie Enock were the country's flagbearers during the opening ceremony.

Medalists

Competitors
The following is the list of number of competitors participating at the Games per sport/discipline.

Note

Athletics

One para athlete was selected, having qualified via the World Para Athletics World Rankings for performances registered between 31 December 2020 and 25 April 2022. Another two athletes were selected as of 31 May 2022.

Men
Track and road events

Field events

Women
Track and road events

Field events

Beach volleyball

By virtue of their position in the extended FIVB Beach Volleyball World Rankings (based on performances between 16 April 2018 and 31 March 2022), Vanuatu qualified for the women's tournament. The pairing was decided shortly afterward.

Women's tournament
Group C

Quarterfinals

Semifinals

Bronze medal match

Boxing

Men

Judo

Men

Women

Para powerlifting

One powerlifter was selected.

Table tennis

Singles

Team

Weightlifting

Vanuatu accepted a Bipartite Invitation for the weightlifting competition and selected Ajah Pritchard-Lolo to compete.

References

External links
VASANOC Official site

Nations at the 2022 Commonwealth Games
2022
2022 in Vanuatuan sport